Aberdeen F.C. competed in the Scottish Premier Division, Scottish League Cup, Scottish Cup and European Cup Winners' Cup in season 1993–94.

Results

Scottish Premier Division

Final standings

Scottish League Cup

Scottish Cup

European Cup Winners Cup

References
 afcheritage.org

Aberdeen F.C. seasons
Aberdeen